Jeannotte may refer to:

Zec Jeannotte, Québec, Canada
Jeannotte River, river in Mauricie, Quebec, Canada

People with the surname
Chantale Jeannotte, Quebec politician
Dan Jeannotte (born 1981), Canadian actor
Jean-Paul Jeannotte (1926–2021), Canadian tenor and opera artistic director
Hormidas Jeannotte (1843–1909), Quebec politician and notary
Joseph Jeannotte (1902–1988), Canadian politician in Manitoba

See also
Jeannette (disambiguation)